Eriosyce paucicostata, the few-ribbed neoporteria, is a species of cactus in the genus Eriosyce, native to southwest Antofagasta in northern Chile. As its synonym Neoporteria paucicostata it has gained the Royal Horticultural Society's Award of Garden Merit.

Subtaxa
The following subspecies are accepted:
Eriosyce paucicostata subsp. echinus (F.Ritter) Ferryman
Eriosyce paucicostata subsp. floccosa (F.Ritter) Ferryman
Eriosyce paucicostata subsp. paucicostata

References

Notocacteae
Endemic flora of Chile
Flora of northern Chile
Plants described in 2003